N.S.S. College, Cherthala, is a general degree college located in Cherthala, Alappuzha district, Kerala. It was established in the year 1964. The college is affiliated with Kerala University. This college offers different courses in arts, commerce and science.

Accreditation
The college is  recognized by the University Grants Commission (UGC).

Notable alumni
 Anoop Chandran, Malayalam Film Actor
 Josy Joseph, Investigate Journalist

References

External links
http://nsscollegecherthala.ac.in

Universities and colleges in Alappuzha district
Educational institutions established in 1964
1964 establishments in Kerala
Arts and Science colleges in Kerala
Colleges affiliated to the University of Kerala